The 62nd Brigade was a formation of  the British Army. It was raised as part of the new army also known as Kitchener's Army and assigned to the 21st Division and served on the Western Front during the First World War. Brigadier-General George Gater succeeded Brigadier-General C G Rawling as commander of the brigade in November 1917.

Formation
The infantry battalions did not all serve at once, but all were assigned to the brigade during the war.
12th (Service) Battalion, Northumberland Fusiliers 	 
13th (Service) Battalion, Northumberland Fusiliers 
8th (Service) Battalion, East Yorkshire Regiment
10th (Srervice) Battalion, Yorkshire Regiment
1st Battalion, Lincolnshire Regiment
3/4th Battalion, Queen's Royal Regiment (West Surrey)
2nd Battalion, Lincolnshire Regiment 	 
62nd Machine Gun Company
62nd Trench Mortar Battery

References

Infantry brigades of the British Army in World War I